Fontanive is a surname. Notable people with the surname include:

 Juan Fontanive (born 1977), American artist
 Nicola Fontanive (born 1985), Italian ice hockey player
 Petra Fontanive (born 1988), Swiss hurdler